Computer University, Mawlamyine is a university located in Mawlamyine,  Myanmar. It was opened as a Government Computer College in 2000 and designated as a university in 2001.

External links
 Official site

Universities and colleges in Mon State